Anna Brewster is an English actress and model.

Early life
Anna Brewster is from Moseley, Birmingham. She attended St Bernard's RC School, Kings Heath Junior School and Queensbridge School in Moseley before studying for her A levels at Solihull Sixth Form College. She has also studied at the Birmingham School of Speech and Drama.

Career

Acting
Brewster starred as Anita Rutter in Anita and Me (2002), and played Doris in Mrs Henderson Presents (2005). In 2007, she portrayed the starring role of Kate Sherman in the E4 miniseries Nearly Famous, and appeared as Anne Stafford in the television series The Tudors. Brewster also played Cynthia Grant in a 2009 episode of The Royal, and Abby in a 2011 episode of Luther.

In 2009, Brewster starred as Laura in the horror film The Reeds, which premiered at the After Dark Horrorfest. In 2010, she played supermodel Lydia Kane in the BBC series Material Girl. In 2012, Brewster played Georgina, one of the lead roles in the short film Volume, directed by Mahalia Belo. In 2013, she appeared in the BBC series Silent Witness as Deanna Collier.

In December 2015, Brewster appeared as Bazine Netal, a First Order spy in Star Wars: The Force Awakens. From 2015 to 2018, she portrayed Françoise-Athénaïs, Marquise de Montespan in the Canal+ series Versailles.

In 2020, Brewster starred as Shelby Dupree in the action thriller film The Last Days of American Crime. She portrayed Jane Boleyn in the 2021 TV series Anne Boleyn.

Modelling
Brewster modelled a range of women's clothing for designer label Ben Sherman; she was seen in the autumn/winter 2007 range throughout the UK. She appeared in a campaign for Aquascutum, Hermes for two seasons, Jigsaw A/W 2011, Sportsgirl and was the face of Links of London for a season. She has shot editorial for UK and American Glamour, Dazed & Confused, Italian Vogue, Japanese Vogue, Hercules, Plastique and Russian Vogue.

Personal life
Brewster has a daughter, born 2022.

Filmography

Film

Television

References

External links

Actresses from Birmingham, West Midlands
21st-century English actresses
English female models
English film actresses
English television actresses
Living people
People from Moseley
Year of birth missing (living people)